The Ministry of Education under the Royal Government of Bhutan is responsible for formulating sound educational policies leading towards a knowledge-based GNH society.

Vision 
An educated and enlightened society of GNH, built and sustained on the unique Bhutanese values of tha dam-tsig ley gju-drey.

Departments 
The Ministry of Education is responsible for:
Department of Adult and Higher Education  
Department of School Education  
Department of Youth, Culture and Sports  
Dzongkha Development Commission

Priorities 
The Ministry of Education is presently focused on achieving the following objectives:

1. To improve relevance and quality of education

2. To improve access to and sustainability of education

3. To strengthen youth development programme and services

4. To enhance adult literacy and lifelong learning

5. To ensure full utilization of budget

6. To enable effective and efficient ICT Service delivery.

Minister 

 Sangay Ngedup (1998–1999 as Minister of Health and Education)
 Thakur S. Powdyel (2008–2013)
 Norbu Wangchuk (2016–2018)
 Jai Bir Rai (7 November 2018 – present as Minister of Education)

References

Education
Bhutan
Education in Bhutan